Katrina Cameron (born 9 May 1995) is a Canadian group rhythmic gymnast. She represents her nation at international competitions.

She participated at the 2012 Summer Olympics in London. She also competed at world championships, including at the 2011, 2014 and 2015 World Rhythmic Gymnastics Championships.

References

External links
http://olympic.ca/team-canada/katrina-cameron/
http://www.bbc.com/sport/olympics/2012/athletes/5ec33954-8fff-4733-99f2-773ba1d8752c
http://www.mississauga.com/sports-story/6762850-rhythmic-gymnast-katrina-cameron-calls-it-a-career/
https://www.gymbc.org/news/post/canadas-artistic-and-rhythmic-teams-announced-for-pan-am-games
https://www.youtube.com/watch?v=JaX61m47QU8

1995 births
Living people
Canadian rhythmic gymnasts
Sportspeople from Mississauga
Gymnasts at the 2012 Summer Olympics
Olympic gymnasts of Canada
Gymnasts at the 2015 Pan American Games
Gymnasts at the 2011 Pan American Games
Gymnasts at the 2010 Summer Youth Olympics
Pan American Games medalists in gymnastics
Pan American Games silver medalists for Canada
Pan American Games bronze medalists for Canada
Medalists at the 2011 Pan American Games
Medalists at the 2015 Pan American Games
Youth Olympic bronze medalists for Canada
20th-century Canadian women
21st-century Canadian women